The Frente Popular Party (also named Janta Agadhi) is a former political party of Goa, India. It participated in the 1963 Goa general elections without any success.

Background
Frente Popular was founded by communists. Its stated ideals were secularism, democracy and socialism. It attacked the prohibition policy promoted by the Congress and criticized the administration of Goa for nepotism and corruption.

Frente Popular was responsible for organizing mass rallies which were addressed by prominent national communist leaders such as S. A. Dange. It was headed by Bertha Menezes Braganza, a journalist from Bombay.

Views on Goa's statehood

There were persistent demands to merge the Union Territory of Goa into the newly created linguistic state of Maharashtra. The communists in India were staunch supporters of the Samyukta Maharashtra movement, which demanded an enlarged linguistic state of Maharashtra, which included Goa. However, the Frente Popular campaigned against a merger and supported full statehood for Goa.

1963 elections
There were eight political parties in Goa at the time of the first general elections in 1963; however, only four got recognition from the Election Commission of India, including the Frente Popular. The symbol allocated to the Frente Popular was the elephant.

Frente Popular put forth only eight candidates from the 30 available constituencies. It contested mainly in areas with high concentrations of labourers, fielding candidates from the trade unions. Bertha Menezes Braganza ran in Cortalim. The party did not win any seats, polling just 4,548 votes (1.82% of polled votes). The Roman Catholic Church's campaign for the United Goans Party has been cited as a major factor contributing to the party's poor showing.

References

Defunct political parties in Goa
1963 establishments in Goa, Daman and Diu
Political parties established in 1963